Ferenc Bán (born 17 September 1940) is a Hungarian architect, one of the foremost in the progressive design movement, emblematic figure of eastern Hungarian building. He was born in Tokaj, Hungary. His Tokaj home is an icon of building in the countryside.

Qualifications
 1959–64 Budapest Technical University Faculty of Architecture
 1973–75 Master class

Career highlights
 1966–90: Nyírterv
 1990- "A" Studio Kft. (Nyíregyháza)
 Hungarian Builder's chapter area president
 Pécs University of Sciences esteemed teacher
 Master teacher at Master class

Works
 MITÁSZ headquarters, Nyíregyháza (1974–78)
 Cultural House, Nyíregyháza (1979–81)
 City Hall, Mátészalka (1980–85)
 Union headquarters, Nyíregyháza (1986–88)
 Mátészalka Theatre (1983–85)
 Záhony baths(1987)
 National Theatre architectural competition first prize(1998)
 His holiday home in Tokaj (2000) Its geomorphic forms have been noted in various overseas publications.
 Campus Hotel, Debrecen (2005)
 Cultural centre, Nyírbátor (2006)

Prizes
 Pro Urbe prize (1984)
 Ybl Miklós prize (1986)
 Kossuth Prize (1994)
 Pro Architectura prize (1997)
 Hungarian Republic Medal (2003)
 Molnár Farkas prize (2004)

Prima Primissima prize(2004)

References

External links

 Database of Hungarian Art Academy

1940 births
Living people
People from Tokaj
Hungarian architects